In physics, a homothetic vector field (sometimes homothetic collineation or homothety) is a projective vector field which satisfies the condition:

where c is a real constant. Homothetic vector fields find application in the study of singularities in general relativity. They can also be used to generate new solutions for Einstein equations by similarity reduction.

See also

 Affine vector field
 Conformal Killing vector field
 Curvature collineation
 Killing vector field
 Matter collineation
 Spacetime symmetries

References

Mathematical methods in general relativity